Mmathubudukwane is a village in Kgatleng District of Botswana.

Location
The village is located 60 km east of Gaborone, close to the border with South Africa.

Healthcare
It has a health clinic.

Population
The population was 2,049 in 2001 census.

References

Kgatleng District
Villages in Botswana